is a Japanese judoka who won a gold medal at the 2017 World Judo Championships in Budapest and a gold medal at the 2020 Summer Olympics. He is the son of a Japanese mother, Mikako, and an American father, James, who teaches English at a Japanese university.

Wolf became the first athlete of U.S. descent to win the All-Japan Openweight Judo Championships with his victory on 29 April, 2019. On 15 May 2019 he was promoted to 5th dan.

He successfully qualified to represent Japan at the 2020 Summer Olympics, and won the gold medal in the 100 kg competition at the 2020 Olympics held in Tokyo, Japan.

References

External links
 
 
 

1996 births
Living people
Japanese male judoka
Japanese people of American descent
People from Katsushika
World judo champions
Judoka at the 2020 Summer Olympics
Olympic judoka of Japan
Olympic gold medalists for Japan
Olympic silver medalists for Japan
Medalists at the 2020 Summer Olympics
Olympic medalists in judo